The fourth season of the American legal comedy-drama Suits was ordered on October 22, 2013. The fourth season originally aired on USA Network in the United States between June 11, 2014 and March 4, 2015. The season was produced by Hypnotic Films & Television and Universal Cable Productions, and the executive producers were Doug Liman, David Bartis and series creator Aaron Korsh. The season had six series regulars playing employees at the fictional Pearson Specter, later Pearson Specter Litt, law firm in Manhattan: Gabriel Macht, Patrick J. Adams, Rick Hoffman, Meghan Markle, Sarah Rafferty, and Gina Torres. Both Gabriel Macht and Patrick J. Adams made their director debut this season, with Macht directing the eleventh episode while Adams directed the 14th episode.

Overview
The series revolves around corporate lawyer Harvey Specter and his associate attorney Mike Ross, the latter practicing without a law degree.

Cast

Regular cast
 Gabriel Macht as Harvey Specter
 Patrick J. Adams as Mike Ross
 Rick Hoffman as Louis Litt
 Meghan Markle as Rachel Zane
 Sarah Rafferty as Donna Paulsen
 Gina Torres as Jessica Pearson

Recurring cast
 Amanda Schull as Katrina Bennett
 Brandon Firla as Jonathan Sidwell
 Željko Ivanek as Eric Woodall
 D. B. Woodside as Jeff Malone
 Neal McDonough as Sean Cahill
 Brendan Hines as Logan Sanders

Guest cast
 Eric Roberts as Charles Forstman
 Tricia Helfer as Evan Smith
 Rebecca Schull as Edith Ross
 David Costabile as Daniel Hardman

Six actors received star billing in the show's first season. Each character works at the fictional Pearson Hardman law firm in Manhattan.  Gabriel Macht plays corporate lawyer Harvey Specter, who is promoted to senior partner and is forced to hire an associate attorney. Patrick J. Adams plays college dropout Mike Ross, who wins the associate position with his eidetic memory and genuine desire to be a good lawyer. Rick Hoffman plays Louis Litt, Harvey's jealous rival and the direct supervisor of the firm's first-year associates. Meghan Markle plays Rachel Zane, a paralegal who aspires to be an attorney but her test anxiety prevents her from attending Harvard Law School. Sarah Rafferty plays Donna Paulsen, Harvey's long-time legal secretary, confidant, and initially the only one at the firm who knows Mike never attended law school. Gina Torres plays Jessica Pearson, the co-founder and managing partner of the firm.

Brandon Firla reprises his season 3 role as Jonathan Sidwell, Mike's new investment banking employer. Željko Ivanek returns as Eric Woodall, though the season's first episode reveals he has left the U.S. Attorney's office to work for the SEC and go after Harvey from a different angle. D. B. Woodside appears as Jeff Malone, an SEC Attorney and Jessica's lover whom she later hires to work at Pearson Specter. Neal McDonough appears as Sean Cahill, an SEC prosecutor who picks up Woodall's cases against Harvey and the firm. Brendan Hines fills the role of Logan Sanders, Harvey's client who battles Mike and Sidwell for control of Gillis industries; he is also Rachel's former boyfriend. Eric Roberts portrays corrupt billionaire investor Charles Forstman. In the final arc of the season, Tricia Helfer guest stars as Evan Smith, the lawyer for powerful railway company Liberty Rail.

Episodes

Ratings

References

External links 
Suits episodes at USA Network
List of Suits season 1 episodes at Internet Movie Database

04
2014 American television seasons
2015 American television seasons